Tomás Mascarenhas Lemos Reymão Nogueira (born 14 July 1998) is a Portuguese professional footballer who plays as a midfielder. Before that, he spent time at Chelsea, Wolverhampton, Fiorentina and Boavista.

Club career
Reymão made his professional debut with Boavista F.C. in a 1-0 Primeira Liga loss to C.S. Marítimo on 8 July 2020. In the axadrezada team, despite his youth and the change of coaches, he has been consolidating his position in the squad, now in Petit's options, and he is one of the current great hopes of the Black Panthers' supporters.

On 23 July 2022, Reymão moved abroad and joined Spanish Segunda División side Albacete Balompié on a one-year contract. The following 31 January, after just one cup match, he terminated his contract.

References

External links

1998 births
Living people
Footballers from Lisbon
Portuguese footballers
Boavista F.C. players
Primeira Liga players
Albacete Balompié players
Association football midfielders
Portuguese expatriate footballers
Expatriate footballers in England
Expatriate footballers in Italy
Expatriate footballers in Spain
Portuguese expatriate sportspeople in England
Portuguese expatriate sportspeople in Italy
Portuguese expatriate sportspeople in Spain